Orchestina pavesii is a spider species found in Spain, Slovakia, Bulgaria, Algeria, Canary Islands, Egypt and Yemen.

See also 
 List of Oonopidae species

References

External links 

Oonopidae
Spiders of Europe
Spiders of Asia
Spiders of the Canary Islands
Arthropods of Egypt
Spiders of North Africa
Invertebrates of the Arabian Peninsula
Spiders described in 1873